Croton tiglium, known as purging croton, is a plant species in the family Euphorbiaceae.

Etymology
The specific name tiglium is of obscure origin. It may come from the traditional name given by pharmacists to the seeds of the croton plant. According to one suggestion, it may be derived from the Greek tiglos, diarrhea. According to another, it may refer to one of the Maluku islands in Indonesia, ostensibly the home habitat of the species.

Traditional uses
Croton tiglium is one of the 50 fundamental herbs used in traditional Chinese medicine, where it has the name bā dòu.  C. tiglium is known as japaala/ජාපාල or jayapala in Sinhala and used in Sinhala traditional medical system of Sri Lanka and in Sanskrit. The seeds are called jamālgoṭa in Hindi, Marathi, and Urdu, and are well known for their toxicity (severe purgative effect). They are used to treat constipation after the seeds have undergone a traditional Ayurvedic detoxification process with cow's milk (godugdha). This is referred to as Śodhana, a general term for detoxification. The plant is poisonous, with the bark used as an arrow poison and the seeds used to poison fish.

Chemical constituents
Major known chemical constituents are crotonoleic acid, glyceryl crotonate, crotonic acid , crotonic resin, and various carcinogenic phorbol derivatives.

References

External links
Croton tiglium List of Chemicals (Dr. Duke's Databases)

tiglium
Flora of China
Flora of Eastern Asia
Flora of the Indian subcontinent
Flora of Indo-China
Flora of Malesia
Plants used in traditional Chinese medicine
Plants described in 1753
Taxa named by Carl Linnaeus